Giulia Gorlero (born 26 September 1990 in Imperia) is an Italian water polo goalkeeper.

She was part of the Italian team that won the silver medal at the 2016 Summer Olympics and the bronze medal at the 2015 World Aquatics Championships. She was the top goalkeeper at the 2016 Olympics, with 65 saves. She also competed at the 2012 Summer Olympics.

See also
 Italy women's Olympic water polo team records and statistics
 List of Olympic medalists in water polo (women)
 List of women's Olympic water polo tournament goalkeepers
 List of World Aquatics Championships medalists in water polo

References

External links
 

1990 births
Living people
People from Imperia
Italian female water polo players
Water polo goalkeepers
Water polo players at the 2012 Summer Olympics
Water polo players at the 2016 Summer Olympics
Medalists at the 2016 Summer Olympics
Olympic silver medalists for Italy in water polo
World Aquatics Championships medalists in water polo
Universiade medalists in water polo
Universiade bronze medalists for Italy
Medalists at the 2013 Summer Universiade
Sportspeople from the Province of Imperia
21st-century Italian women